, operating as Peach, is a Japanese budget airline.   Its head office is at Kansai International Airport and in Tajiri, Osaka Prefecture.

History

Peach was formed in February 2011 as A&F Aviation, a joint venture between All Nippon Airways (ANA) and the First Eastern Investment Group, a Hong Kong-based private equity and venture capital firm. The company applied for an operating certificate in April 2011 and changed its name to Peach Aviation in May 2011. Its shares were held in almost equal portions by ANA, FEIG, and the Innovation Network Corporation of Japan (INCJ), ANA holding a slightly larger share of the three. ANA controls 77.9% of Peach's stock as of 2018.

Peach's brand development was conducted by CIA, Inc. and The Brand Architect Group, who engaged Neil Denari for aircraft livery design and James Wilkie for uniform design. The airline is based at Kansai International Airport. In July 2011, Peach received 1,909 applications for its first class of ninety flight attendants.

On 1 August 2011, Peach announced that it was moving its operations office from Aeroplaza to Kensetsu-to.

Peach's first aircraft, an Airbus A320, was delivered to its home base at Kansai International Airport in November 2011. Within its fleet, Peach has two named aircraft. Its first A320 was named Peach Dream; its tenth A320 was named Wing of Tohoku following a contest in which sixty elementary school students from the Tohoku region submitted proposals. The airline's first flight was on 1 March 2012, between Osaka Kansai and New Chitose Airport, which serves the Sapporo metropolitan area.

Peach was the most successful of the three new Japanese low-cost carriers during their first year of operations, with average load factors around 80 percent versus 70 percent for Jetstar Japan and 50 to 60 percent for AirAsia Japan. Peach's 24-hour operations and exclusive terminal at Kansai Airport were credited for its relative success, as well as its stronger focus on certain passenger experience factors such as its reservations and check-in systems.

However, during the summer 2014 season Peach cancelled over 2,000 planned flights (about 16% of its total capacity) due to a shortage of pilots. The airline planned to have 62 pilots by October 2014 but only had 52 as of April, eight of whom were unable to fly due to sickness or injury. Loss of pilots to other airlines was a contributing cause for the shortage. It was later reported that Peach would consider allowing its pilots to commute from Tokyo Haneda to Osaka Kansai on other airlines, a practice rarely allowed in Japan, in order to attract candidates who were unwilling to relocate to Osaka.

In May 2017, Peach became the first airline in Japan to accept bitcoin as payment.

On 22 March 2018, All Nippon Airways announced the integration of its two low-cost carrier subsidiaries Peach and Vanilla Air, with Peach as the surviving brand. Integration would begin during the second half of the 2018 fiscal year (FY) and to be completed by the end of FY2019. The combined airline also planned to operate over 50 aircraft and routes beyond FY2020, up from 35 aircraft and 39 routes at the time of announcement, as well as targeted a ¥150 billion revenue and a 10% operating profit for FY2020. Vanilla Air ceased operations on 26 October 2019, with its operations integrated with Peach's.

Destinations
During its operating history, Peach has offered service to the following destinations :

Fleet

, the Peach fleet consists of the following Airbus aircraft:

Livery 
The livery of Peach consists of a pink, purple and white colour scheme. The fuselage and vertical stabilizer is painted in pink and purple except for the front fuselage, which is painted in white. The brand name 'Peach' is painted on the vertical stabilizer and the front fuselage. Both wingtips are painted in pink.

Accidents and incidents
The aircraft's ground proximity warning system alerted the pilot to the low altitude, and the plane landed safely at Naha.

References

External links

 Official website

All Nippon Airways
Airlines of Japan
Airlines established in 2011
Companies based in Osaka Prefecture
Japanese brands
Japanese companies established in 2011
Low-cost carriers